St George's Barracks are a military installation near to the village of North Luffenham in Rutland.

History
The barracks were established on the site of the former RAF North Luffenham airfield in 1998. They became the home of the Royal Regiment of Fusiliers in 1999, of the King's Own Royal Border Regiment in 2003 and of the 16th Regiment Royal Artillery in 2007. In April 2013 16th Regiment Royal Artillery received the Freedom of Oakham on behalf of the barracks. In July 2014 16th Regiment Royal Artillery moved to Baker Barracks, Thorney Island. 2 Medical Regiment, Royal Army Medical Corps and 1 Military Working Dogs Regiment, Royal Army Veterinary Corps moved into St George's Barracks later that year.

Closure
In November 2016, the Ministry of Defence announced that the site would close between 2020 and 2021. This was later extended to 2022, and once more to 2026.

Based units 
The following notable units are based at St George's Barracks.

British Army 
Royal Army Medical Corps (102 Logistic Brigade)

 2 Medical Regiment

Royal Army Veterinary Corps

 1st Military Working Dog Regiment
 101 Military Working Dog Squadron (Reserves) 
 102 Military Working Dog Squadron 
 103 Headquarters & Support Military Working Dog Squadron 
 104 Military Working Dog Squadron
 105 Military Working Dog Squadron

References

Installations of the British Army
Barracks in England